"The Fall of the House of Usher" is an 1839 short story by Edgar Allan Poe.

The Fall of the House of Usher and The House of Usher may also refer to adaptations of that work:

Film and television
The Fall of the House of Usher (1928 American film), by James Sibley Watson
The Fall of the House of Usher (1928 French film), by Jean Epstein
The Fall of the House of Usher (1950 film),  a British film directed by Ivan Barnett 
House of Usher (film), 1960, by Roger Corman
The House of Usher (1989 film), directed by Alan Birkinshaw
The House of Usher (2006 film), directed by Hayley Cloake
The Fall of the House of Usher (miniseries), an upcoming series created by Mike Flanagan based on the short story and other works by Poe

Operas
La chute de la maison Usher (opera), unfinished, by Claude Debussy, of which three separate completions have been composed and staged
 The Fall of the House of Usher (Glass opera), a 1987 opera by Philip Glass
The Fall of the House of Usher (Hammill opera), 1991, by Peter Hammill and Chris Judge Smith
Usher House, a 2014 opera by Gordon Getty

See also
 The Fall of the House of Usher#Film, TV or theatrical adaptations, a complete list of adaptations